The 2001 Greek Cup Final was the 57th final of the Greek Cup. The match took place on 12 May 2001 at Nikos Goumas Stadium. The contesting teams were Olympiacos and PAOK. It was Olympiacos' twenty-ninth Greek Cup Final in their 76 years of existence and PAOK's fifteenth Greek Cup Final in their 75-year history. A draw was preceded on 19 April to determine in which stadium/city the final would be hosted: Nikos Goumas Stadium in Athens or Kaftanzoglio Stadium in Thessaloniki. Several days before the game, Olympiacos president Sokratis Kokkalis made a memorable statement using a Greek expression that Olympiacos would lose the upcoming final only if the devil would break his leg, meaning that it was almost impossible for his team to lose. However, PAOK won the match 4–2 with an impressive performance and earned the trophy 27 years after their last success, in the same stadium against the same opponent. During the awarding ceremony, former goalkeeper of PAOK Mladen Furtula (member of the coaching staff then) whispered to Kokkalis that the devil did break his leg that day and Kokkalis responded with a laugh. PAOK manager Dušan Bajević, became the first in history to win the trophy with three different teams. He also won it with AEK Athens in 1996 and Olympiacos in 1999.

Venue
This was the eighth Greek Cup Final held at the Nikos Goumas Stadium, after the 1962, 1967, 1974, 1976, 1980, 1981, and 1982 finals.

The Nikos Goumas Stadium was constructed in 1930 and it has been twice renovated, 1979 and 1998. The stadium was used as a venue for Greece in various occasions. Its current capacity is 28,729.

Background
Olympiacos had reached the Greek Cup Final twenty seven times, winning twenty of them. The last time that had played in a Final was in 1999, where they had won Panathinaikos by 2–0.

PAOK had reached the Greek Cup Final fourteen times, winning two of them. The last time that they had won the Cup was in 1974 (4–3 on penalties against Olympiacos). The last time that had played in a Final was in 1992, where they had lost to Olympiacos by 3–1 on aggregate (1–1 at Toumba Stadium and 2–0 at Karaiskakis Stadium).

Route to the final

Match

Details

See also
2000–01 Greek Football Cup

References

2001
Cup Final
Greek Cup Final 2001
Greek Cup Final 2001
Sports competitions in Athens
April 2001 sports events in Europe